The Cameron Blockhouse is a timber blockhouse in Wanganui, New Zealand, built during the New Zealand Wars in the mid-19th century. It is a rare surviving example of a privately constructed redoubt from that era.

John Cameron bought the property known as Marangai in 1841,  but it wasn't until around 1868, when he commissioned a blockhouse to protect his family from what he believed was an impending attack by Māori leader Riwha Titokowaru. Titokowaru had won several battles in south Taranaki and was heading south to Wanganui. Heightening the fears of settlers was Te Kooti's raid of Poverty Bay that occurred around the same time.

The blockhouse consists of a floor of compacted earth, double-skinned tōtara walls with clay infill and a corrugated iron roof. Clay was used in the walls for protection against bullets and the threat of fire.

References

Forts in New Zealand
New Zealand Wars
Buildings and structures in Whanganui
Heritage New Zealand Category 1 historic places in Manawatū-Whanganui
1860s architecture in New Zealand
Blockhouses